The 2015–16 Basketball League Belgium Division I season, for sponsorships reasons named the Scooore! League, was the 89th season of the first tier of basketball in Belgium. The season started on October 2, 2015 and ended on 8 June 2016. The defending champion was Oostende, and it successfully defended its title.

Teams

The name of Okapi Aalstar was changed to Crelan Okapi Aalstar due to sponsorship reasons on June 3, 2015.

Personnel and kits

Managerial changes

Regular season
The regular season started on October 2, 2015 with the game Basic-Fit Brussels–Telenet Oostende.

Standings

Playoffs

Awards

References

Basketball League Belgium Division I seasons
Belgian
Lea